Hypenodes kalchbergi is a species of moth in the family Erebidae. It was described by Staudinger in 1876. It is found in Slovenia, the former Yugoslavia and on Sicily.

The wingspan is 12–15 mm.

References

Moths described in 1876
Hypenodinae
Moths of Asia
Moths of Europe